Dotternhausen is a municipality in the Zollernalbkreis district, in Baden-Württemberg, Germany.

History
That district was dissolved in 1938, so Dotternhausen was again reassigned, this time to the newly-created . Dotternhausen began period of steady growth after World War II, particularly in the 1950s and 1960s. In 1973, when , and Dotternhausen was assigned to the new district of Zollernalb.

Geography
It is physically located along the edge of the Swabian Jura, with the town of Dotternhausen at the foot of the Plettenberg. The primary watercourses in the municipal area are the Schlichem, which forms its southern border, and the Katzenbach, which flows into the Eyach near Balingen. Elevation above sea level in the municipality ranges from a low of  Normalnull (NN) to a high of  NN at the top of the Plettenberg.

A portion of the Federally-protected  nature reserve is located in Dotternhausen's municipal area.

Coat of arms
Dotternhausen's coat of arms displays a stag in yellow, posed and facing left, over a field of blue. The coat of arms was approved by the Reichsstatthalter of Württemberg on 20 December 1938.

Transportation
Dotternhausen is connected to Germany's network of Federal highways by Bundesstraße 27. Local rail traffic is made up entirely of freight trains.

References

External links
  (in German)

Württemberg